The Family Law Act 1996 (c 27) is an Act of Parliament of the United Kingdom governing divorce law and marriage. The law intends to modernise divorce and to shift slightly towards "no fault" divorce from the fault-based approach of the Matrimonial Causes Act 1973. The main part of the Act, dealing with divorce, was not proceeded with after pilot schemes found that it did not work well.

Contents
Part I of the Act sets out the philosophical approach to divorce.

Part II set out a procedure for divorce which required spouses seeking divorce to attend a preliminary Information Session and to seek mediation as a first step. Part II and related sections of other parts were repealed and partially replaced by section 18 of the Children and Families Act 2014 after they were abandoned in practice in 1999.

Part III of the act concerns provision of legal aid for mediation in family law and divorce.

Part IV set out the mechanisms and principles related to family homes (in particular notices affecting land given under the Land Registration Act 2002 as amended), occupation orders, non-molestation orders and domestic violence orders and principles. Sections 30 and 31 concern the award of a statutory licence to occupy a home.

Part IVA contains provisions related to forced marriage. This was added by the Forced Marriage (Civil Protection) Act 2007.

Part V contains supplemental sections.

Reception 
The divorce sections of the Act received a great deal of media discussion and criticism, with some seeing the new approach to divorce as encouraging "quickie" divorces (although in practice, a fault-based divorce under the old scheme could be completed much quicker than under this Act). The political commentator Anne McElvoy welcomed the abandonment of the Act's divorce sections seeing the extensive waiting periods and required mediation as an intrusive compromise between a proper "no fault" divorce system and the needs of "family fundamentalists".

Related developments

Following the decision by the UK Supreme Court in Owens v Owens, in February 2019 Justice Secretary David Gauke said that he would introduce legislation enacting no-fault divorce in the next session of Parliament.

See also
English land law
English property law
English family law
Children Act 1989

References

United Kingdom Acts of Parliament 1996
Family law in the United Kingdom
Property law of the United Kingdom